Peter Whitehead may refer to:

Peter Whitehead (businessman), (1793–1866) British businessman
Peter Whitehead (racing driver) (1914–1958), British racing driver
Peter Whitehead (filmmaker) (1937–2019), British filmmaker
Peter Whitehead (runner) (born 1964), British long-distance runner
Peter Whitehead (songwriter), songwriter for American disco group Village People

See also
 Whitehead (surname)